Cogeces del Monte is a municipality located in the province of Valladolid, Castile and León, Spain. According to the 2004 census (INE), the municipality has a population of 863 inhabitants.

In 1976 a public pool was built, which is now the social hub of Cogeces in the summer. 
Cogeces del Monte is fourth minutes from Valladolid and twelve minutes from Cuellar. It has a simple bus system, one bus in the morning, one in the evening.

References

Municipalities in the Province of Valladolid